Austin Albert Mardon,  Ph.D. (born 25 June 1962) is an author, community leader, and advocate for mental health. He is an assistant adjunct professor at the John Dossetor Health Ethics Centre at the University of Alberta. In the mid 80's, he founded and today still directs the Antarctic Institute of Canada, a non-profit entity based in Edmonton, Alberta. He is currently married to lawyer and activist Catherine Mardon, and has co-written several books with her.

Biography

Family history
Mardon's paternal grandfather, Austin Mardon, attended Cambridge University prior to becoming a professor in comparative classics and history. With his wife, Marie, Mardon's grandfather purchased Ardross Castle in Scotland, which remained in the Mardon family until 1983.

Early years
Dr. Mardon was born in Edmonton, Alberta in 1962 to May and Ernest George Mardon. Dr. Mardon grew up in Lethbridge and currently resides in Edmonton.

As a child, Dr. Mardon was often sick and subject to a great deal of bullying in school. During this time, he spent many winters in Hawaii with his mother and sister. In his late teens, Dr. Mardon lived in Scotland and attended Grenoble University.

Afterwards, Dr. Mardon returned to Canada and attended the University of Lethbridge. Here, he pursued a major in geography. He also served in the Canadian Primary Reserves, taking his basic training at the Canadian Armed Forces Base at Dundurn, Saskatchewan.

Education
Dr. Mardon graduated in 1985 with a major in cultural geography from the University of Lethbridge. He became a graduate student at South Dakota State University, where he also attended the Space Studies Program, and received a master's of science in 1988. He also received a master's degree in education from Texas A&M University in 1990. After he was diagnosed with schizophrenia, he earned a Ph.D. from Greenwich University. He has done work on other degrees from Newman Theological College, Kharkov National University, and the University of South Africa. He received an honorary law degree (LL.D.) from the University of Alberta in 2011.

Career
While doing graduate work at the South Dakota State University in 1986, Dr. Mardon was invited to be a member of the 1986-87 Antarctic meteorite expedition for NASA and the National Science Foundation. 170 miles from the South Pole station when his team found hundreds of meteorites. During his sojourn he suffered environmental exposure which damaged his lungs and gave him a permanent cough. He received the Antarctica Service Medal for his efforts and risk.

On his return to Alberta, he gave lectures on Antarctica at the University of Calgary and the University of Lethbridge. He secured an interview to be a member of the Canadian/Soviet Arctic traverse from northern Siberia to Ellesmere Island in the Canadian Arctic, but failed to get on that expedition.

He was a part of the failed meteorite recovery expedition in the Canadian Arctic near Resolute in the Northwest Territories, and wrote a paper on his conversations with locals and what the Inuit thought of meteorites. He was also supposed to join an Argentinian Antarctic expedition in the late 80's, but a fire at the Argentinian Antarctic base caused his membership to be canceled.

One of his most significant contributions to astronomical science was a series of articles he wrote on the Anglo-Saxon Chronicle. The Chronicle is a running commentary on different events in England during the medieval period. With the assistance of his father, a medieval scholar, Dr. Mardon found eleven cometary events mentioned in the Chronicle that are not mentioned anywhere else in astronomical literature, as well as two meteor showers recorded in the Chronicle.

In 1991, Dr. Mardon was invited to join an expedition to the South Pole sponsored by the Geographical Society of the USSR. He traveled to Moscow and met with some expedition officials, receiving a strange welcome with little information and odd accommodations. He soon found out that he was under suspicion by the authorities and was arrested first by the GRU, then by the KGB. Dr. Mardon was questioned, held for a time, and then forced to wander the streets of Moscow with an escort that could have been a spy or guard as well as a guide. Dr. Mardon finally secured passage back to Canada after a harrowing experience in Moscow, and eventually received an official letter of apology from Moscow.

In 1992, Dr. Mardon was diagnosed with schizophrenia. Following his diagnosis, Dr. Mardon began work as an activist for people with mental illnesses. Dr. Mardon has written multiple books on the subject of mental illness, and has been bestowed several honors and awards for his work as a mental health advocate. In 2011 the Canadian Medical Association (CMA) awarded Dr. Mardon the CMA Medal of Honour in recognition of, "[...] personal contributions to the advance of medical research and education." In regards to the awarding of the medal to Dr. Mardon, CMA president Jeff Turnbull said, "Dr. Mardon has worked tirelessly to help Canadians better understand the issues around mental illness. In courageously talking openly about his own experiences, he is truly making a difference in coaxing mental illness out of the shadows in this country." Dr. Mardon received his most prestigious honor in 2006, when he was awarded the Order of Canada.

As of February 2019, Austin has been serving on the University of Lethbridge senate.

Bibliography

Austin Mardon has edited, authored and self-published 50 books. He has published books on Canadian politics, history, mental health, science, geography, fiction and children's fiction as well as numerous scholarly articles and abstracts. Many of his written works explore the topic of mental illness, with a specific focus on providing aid to disabled people.

Non-fiction 
A Conspectus of the Contribution of Herodotus to the Development of Geographical Thought (1990. Reprint in 2011)
A Description of the Western Isles of Scotland (1990, Translator, with Ernest Mardon)
The Alberta Judiciary Dictionary (1990, with Ernest Mardon)
International Law and Space Rescue Systems (1991)
Kensington Stone and Other Essays (1991)
A Transient in Whirl (1991)
The Men of the Dawn: Alberta Politicians from the North West Territories of the District of Alberta and Candidates for the First Alberta General Election (1991, With Ernest Mardon)
Down and Out and on the Run in Moscow (1992, with Ernest Mardon)
Alberta General Election Returns and Subsequent Byelections, 1882-1992, Documentary Heritage Society of Alberta (1993, with Ernest Mardon)
Edmonton Political Biographical Dictionary, 1882-1990: A Work in Progress (1993, with Ernest Mardon)
Biographical Dictionary of Alberta Politicians (1993, with Ernest Mardon)
Alberta Executive Council, 1905-1990 (1994, co-author)
Alone against the Revolution (1996, with M.F. Korn)
Early Catholic Saints (1997, co-author)
Later Christian Saints (1997, co-author)
Childhood Memories and Legends of Christmas Past (1998, co-author) 
United Farmers of Alberta (1999, co-author)
The Insanity Machine (2003, with Kenna McKinnon)
English Medieval Cometry References Over a Thousand Years (2008, with Ernest Mardon and Cora Herrick)
2004 Politicians (2009, with Ernest Mardon)
A Description of the Western Isles of Scotland (2009, with Ernest Mardon)
Space Rescue Systems in the Context of International Laws (2009)
Alberta Election Returns, 1887-1994 (2010, with Ernest Mardon)
Community Place Names of Alberta (2010, with Ernest Mardon)
Alberta's Judicial Leadership (2011, with Ernest Mardon)
The Mormon Contribution to Alberta Politics (2 ed.) (2011, with Ernest Mardon)
Mapping Alberta's Political Leadership (2011, with Ernest Mardon and Joseph Harry Veres)
Alberta's Political Pioneers (2011, with Ernest Mardon)
Alberta Ethnic German Politicians (2011, with Ernest Mardon and Catherine Mardon)
Financial Stability for the Disabled (2012, with Shelley Qian and Kayle Paustian)
The Liberals in Power in Alberta 1905-1921 (2012, with Ernest Mardon)
Designed by Providence (2012, with Ernest Mardon and Claire MacMaster)
Who's Who in Federal Politics in Alberta (2012, with Ernest Mardon)
What's in a Name? (2012, with Ernest Mardon)
History and Origin of Alberta Constituencies (2012, with Catherine Mardon)
The Conflict Between the Individual & Society in the Plays of James Bridie (2012, with Ernest Mardon)
Alberta Catholic Politicians (2012, with Ernest Mardon)
Tea with the Mad Hatter (2012, with Erin Campbell)
Lethbridge Politicians: Federal, Provincial & Civic (2 ed.) (2013, with Ernest Mardon)
Alberta Anglican Politicians (2013, with Ernest Mardon)
Political Networks in Alberta: 1905-1992 (2 ed.) (2014)

Children's books 
Many Christian Saints for Children (1997, coauthor) 
Early Saints and Other Saintly Stories for Children (2011, with May Mardon and Ernest Mardon)
When Kitty Met the Ghost (2 ed.) (2012, with Ernest Mardon)
The Girl Who Could Walk Through Walls (2012, with Ernest Mardon)
Gandy and Parker Escape the Zoo: An Illustrated Adventure (2013, with Catherine Mardon)
Grownup for a Week (2014, with Catherine Mardon, Aala Abdullahi and Agata Garbowska)
Gandy and the Cadet (2015, with Catherine Mardon)
Gandy and the Man in White (2016, with Catherine Mardon)

Awards and honours
Antarctic Service Medal- US Congress(Navy)- 1987
Duke of Edinburgh Award- Bronze Level- 1987
Texas State Proclamation #51, Texas Legislature- 1988
Governor Generals Caring Canadian Award- 1996, presented 1999
Nadine Stirling Award, Canadian Mental Health Association- Alberta 1999
Flag of Hope Award, Schizophrenia Society of Canada- 2001
Distinguished Alumni Award from the University of Lethbridge- 2002
Presidents Award, Canadian Mental Health Association-Alberta- 2002
Queen Elizabeth II Golden Jubilee Medal- 2002
Alberta Centennial Medal- 2005
Ron LaJeunnesse Leadership Award, Canadian Mental Health Association- Edmonton 2005
Order of St. Sylvester - 2017 
Order of Canada, Member- October 2006, Invested- October 2007
Bill Jefferies Family Award, Schizophrenia Society of Canada- 2007
C.M. Hincks Award, Canadian Mental Health Association- National Division- 2007
Best National Editorial, Canadian Church Press- 2010 for Western Catholic Reporter article
Medal of Honour, Alberta Medical Association- October 2010
Mental Health Media Award, Canadian Mental Health Association-Alberta October 2010 for AHE Edmonton Journal articles
Honorable Kentucky Colonel- Commonwealth of Kentucky April 2011
Honorary Doctorate, L.L.D., University of Alberta- 10 June 2011
Medal of Honour, Canadian Medical Association- 25 August 2011
Catherine & Austin Mardon CM Schizophrenia Award permanently endowed at U of Alberta for $500 per annum 2012
Dr's Catherine & Austin Mardon CM Student Award Bursary established at Newman Theological College 2012
Queen Elizabeth II Diamond Jubilee Medal- Presented 28 May 2012
Catherine & Austin Mardon CM Schizophrenia Award endowed at Norquest College for $1,000 per annum August 2013
Honorary Doctorate, L.L.D., University of Lethbridge, 19 June 2014
Honorary Social Worker, Alberta College of Social Workers, April 2015
Mardon was elected into the Royal Society of Canada as a Specially Elected Fellow in 2014.
Order of St.Sylvester (2017)

References

External links
 Austin Mardon website

Scientists from Edmonton
Living people
1962 births
Writers from Edmonton
20th-century Canadian male writers
20th-century Canadian non-fiction writers
21st-century Canadian male writers
21st-century Canadian non-fiction writers
Canadian children's writers
Grenoble Alpes University alumni
University of Lethbridge alumni
South Dakota State University alumni
Texas A&M University alumni
Members of the Order of Canada
Fellows of the Royal Society of Canada
People with schizophrenia
20th-century Canadian scientists
21st-century Canadian scientists
Canadian male non-fiction writers